The Top-75 Albums Sales Chart, also known as Top 75 Combined Repertoire chart, is the official weekly albums chart of Greece, which ranks the best-selling albums in the country. The chart, which is compiled by IFPI Greece, the Greek branch of the International Federation of the Phonographic Industry, debuted in October 2010, replacing and combining the prior separate Greek-language and foreign album charts.

2016

References

Greece
Greek entertainment-related lists
Greece albums